Federico Chabod or Frédéric Chabod ( - February 23, 1901 – July 14, 1960) was an Italian historian and politician.

Biography 
Born in Aosta from notary Laurent from Valsavarenche and Giuseppina Baratino from Ivrea, he studied at the University of Turin under Pietro Egidi and Gaetano Salvemini, writing his thesis on Machiavelli. His thesis was published with the title of Introduzione al Principe in 1924. After graduating from the University of Turin, he continued his studies, this time at the University of Berlin under Friedrich Meinecke. He began his academic career at the University of Perugia and the University of Milan. In 1946, he was hired by the University of Rome to head the Istituto Italiano per gli Studi Storici founded by Benedetto Croce.  He is best known for  expanding Italian historiography from its traditional insularity by linking it in a broader, European context.

Chabod died at Rome in 1960.

Works

 L'Italia contemporanea
 L'Historiographie de l'Italie contemporaine
 De Machiavel à Benedetto Croce: études présentées
 Histoire de l'idée d'Europe
 Storia della politica estera italiana dal 1870 al 1896, 1951. English trans. 1996.
 Lezioni di metodo storico
 Scritti su Machiavelli
 Scritti sul Rinascimento
 Il ducato di Milano e l'impero di Carlo V
 Lo Stato e la vita religiosa a Milano nell'epoca di Carlo V
 Storia di Milano nell'epoca di Carlo V
 Carlo V e il suo impero
 Storia dell'idea d'Europa
 Idea di Europa e politica dell'equilibro
 L'idea di nazione

References

External links
Conseil de la Vallée (Aosta Valley Regional Council) (in French and Italian)

Further reading
 Boyd, Kelly, ed. Encyclopedia of historians and historical writing. Vol. 1 (Taylor & Francis, 1999) pp 192–94.
 Braudel, Fernand. "Federico Chabod (1901-1960)." Annales. Histoire, Sciences Sociales 16#1 (1961). pp 1–2.
 Vigezzi, Brunello ed. Federico. Chabod e la Nuova Storiografia italiana dal primo al secondo dopoguerra, 1919–1950. (Edizioni Universitarie Jaca, 1983). Pp. xxiii, 719.

1901 births
1960 deaths
Presidents of Aosta Valley
People from Aosta
20th-century Italian historians
University of Turin alumni
Corresponding Fellows of the British Academy